Penangodyna is a monotypic genus of Southeast Asian cribellate araneomorph spiders in the family Dictynidae containing the single species, Penangodyna tibialis. It was first described by J. Wunderlich in 1995, and has only been found in Malaysia.

References

Dictynidae
Monotypic Araneomorphae genera
Spiders of Asia